Dunkle is a surname. Notable people with the surname include:

 Clare B. Dunkle (born 1964), American author
 Davey Dunkle (1872–1941), Major League Baseball pitcher
 David Dunkle (1911–1984), American paleontologist
 Jon Dunkle (born 1960), American serial killer
 Margaret Dunkle (born 1947), American academic
 Nancy Dunkle (born 1955), American basketball player
 William Dunkle (born 1999), American football player

See also
 Dunkel (disambiguation)
 Dunkle Corners, Pennsylvania, unincorporated community
 Dunkle Run, tributary in Pennsylvania